Psammodromus manulae is a species of lizard in the family Lacertidae. The species is endemic to Iberia and was previously thought to be a subspecies of the large psammodromus. Its population is stable and it is classified as least concern by the IUCN.

Distribution
The species is endemic to Portugal and western Spain.

References

manuelae